Rachel, Rachel is a 1968 American technicolor drama film produced and directed by Paul Newman and starring his wife, Joanne Woodward, in the title role and co-starring Estelle Parsons and James Olson. The screenplay, by Stewart Stern based on the 1966 novel A Jest of God by Canadian author Margaret Laurence, concerns a schoolteacher in small-town Connecticut and her sexual awakening and independence in her mid-30s. The film was nominated for four Academy Awards (Best Picture, Best Adapted Screenplay, Best Actress for Woodward, and Best Supporting Actress for Parsons) and won two Golden Globes: Best Director and Best Actress (Drama).

Plot
Rachel Cameron is a shy, 35-year-old unmarried schoolteacher living with her widowed mother in an apartment above the funeral home once owned by her father in a small town in Connecticut. School is out for summer vacation, and Rachel anticipates a typical boring summer at home with her mother. Fellow unmarried teacher and best friend Calla Mackie persuades Rachel to attend a revival meeting, where a visiting preacher encourages Rachel to express her need for the love of Jesus. Rachel is overwhelmed by the experience, expressing so much suppressed emotion that she is embarrassed. Calla tries to comfort Rachel and suddenly kisses her passionately. Rachel is shocked and runs home and then begins to avoid Calla.

Nick Kazlik, Rachel's high-school classmate who now teaches at an inner city school in the Bronx, arrives for a short visit. Upon first seeing Rachel, Nick makes a crude pass that Rachel rebuffs, but after the episode with Calla, she succumbs to his charms and has her first sexual experience. Mistaking lust for love, she begins to plan a future with Nick, who tries to rebuff her gently by showing her a photo of a young boy and woman, implying that it is his son and wife. Through Nick's mother, Rachel later discovers that in fact he has no wife nor child.

Believing that she is pregnant, Rachel plans to leave town and raise the child. With Calla's assistance, she finds another teaching job in Oregon, but before the summer ends, she learns that she is not pregnant and that her symptoms are the result of a benign cyst. After undergoing surgery to have the cyst removed, Rachel tells her mother that she will relocate and that her mother may accompany her if she wishes. Her mother reluctantly agrees to accompany her. Rachel sets out with hope for the future, having learned that she has choices, that she is able to give and receive sexual pleasure and that it is possible for her to actively embrace life rather than waiting for it to find her.

Cast
 Joanne Woodward as Rachel Cameron
 James Olson as Nick Kazlik
 Kate Harrington as May Cameron
 Estelle Parsons as Calla Mackie
 Donald Moffat as Niall Cameron
 Terry Kiser as Preacher
 Frank Corsaro as Hector Jonas
 Bernard Barrow as Leighton Siddley
 Geraldine Fitzgerald as Reverend Wood

Production
The film marked Paul Newman's directorial debut. It was filmed in August 1967 in various Connecticut locations including Bethel, Danbury, Georgetown and Redding.

Newman and Woodward's daughter Nell Potts portrays Rachel as a child in flashback scenes.

Reception 
In a contemporary review for The New York Times, critic Renata Adler called Rachel, Rachel "the best written, most seriously acted American movie in a long time" and wrote: "The direction is mainly sensitive and discreet, but now and then the whole thing goes awash in excess of sentimentality or even ambition. You cannot convey the quality of life in this sort of town, through Rachel's perspective, without losing proportion in melodrama and glop. Petty tragedies, faithfully portrayed, are a little embarrassing. ... If this were a less ironic age, it might work seriously and completely—like a kind of American cinema Balzac."

Time magazine wrote: "Stewart Stern often gets too close to the novel, adopting where he should adapt. Rachel is shackled with prosy monologues that should have been given visual form. Despite its failings, Rachel, Rachel has several unassailable assets...It is in the transcendent strength of Joanne Woodward that the film achieves a classic stature. There is no gesture too minor for her to master. She peers out at the world with the washed-out eyes of a hunted animal. Her walk is a ladylike retreat, a sign of a losing battle with time and diets and fashion. Her drab voice quavers with a brittle strength that can command a student but break before a parent's will. By any reckoning, it is [her] best performance."

Variety called Rachel, Rachel an "offbeat film" that "moves too slowly" and added: "There is very little dialog—most of which is very good—but this asset makes a liability out of the predominantly visual nature of the development, which in time seems to become redundant, padded and tiring. ... Direction is awkward. Were Woodward not there film could have been a shambles."

On Rotten Tomatoes, 90% of critics gave a positive review of the film based on 10 reviews, with an average rating of 7 out of 10.

Accolades

Home media
Warner Home Video released the film on Region 1 DVD on February 17, 2009.

See also
List of American films of 1968

References

External links

1968 films
1968 drama films
1968 LGBT-related films
American drama films
American LGBT-related films
1960s feminist films
Films about virginity
Films based on Canadian novels
Films directed by Paul Newman
Films featuring a Best Drama Actress Golden Globe-winning performance
Films scored by Jerome Moross
Films set in Connecticut
Films shot in Connecticut
Films whose director won the Best Director Golden Globe
Funeral homes in fiction
Films with screenplays by Stewart Stern
Warner Bros. films
1968 directorial debut films
Films based on works by Margaret Laurence
1960s English-language films
1960s American films